Umm Sulaim is a subject of Baladiyah al-Shumaisi and a historical neighborhood within the erstwhile old city walls in southern Riyadh, Saudi Arabia. Spread across 90 hectares, it shares borders with al-Wisham neighborhood to the north, ash-Shumaysi neighborhood to south and ad-Dirah neighborhood to the east. It is named after Umm Sulaym bint Milhan, one of the earliest female converts to Islam.

References 

Neighbourhoods in Riyadh